Steve Bolstad is a politician who was a Democratic Party member of the Montana House of Representatives. He represented District 24 from 2007 to 2008.

External links
Montana House of Representatives - Steve Bolstad official MT State Legislature website
Project Vote Smart - Representative Steve Bolstad (MT) profile
Follow the Money - Steve Bolstad
2008 campaign contributions

Members of the Montana House of Representatives
1966 births
Living people